Cryptometrion is a monotypic genus of fungi within the family Cryphonectriaceae containing the sole species Cryptometrion aestuescens.

External links

Monotypic Sordariomycetes genera
Diaporthales